Daniel Nii Armah Tagoe (born 3 March 1986) is a Ghanaian-Kyrgyz international footballer who plays as a defender for Dushanbe-83 in the Tajikistan Higher League. 
 He is also a member of the Kyrgyzstan national football team.

Club career
The Ghanaian-born Tagoe started his career for local side Eleven Stoppers and played later for Dansoman United. In 2005 went to Russia to sign for Tatarstan based club KAMAZ Naberezhnye Chelny. After two years in Russia, he went to Dordoi Bishkek where he played five seasons and acquired Kyrgyzstani citizenship. In 2009, he won the best Kyrgyzstan Player of the Year award, as the 23-year-old was instrumental to Dordoi Bishkek success that season. At the start of 2010, Tagoe and David Tetteh looked at moving to Tajik League club Vakhsh Qurghonteppa, but ultimately returned to Dordoi Bishkek, how claimed they had a valid contract until 2012.

On 30 August 2016, Tagoe signed for Al-Hala in the Bahraini Premier League, returning to Dordoi Bishkek in December 2016, signing a two-year contract with the club.

In November 2017, Tagoe and Pavel Sidorenko earned their AFC 'C' coaching diploma.

On 26 October 2018, Tagoe signed a one-year contract with Bangladesh Premier League club Chittagong Abahani Limited.

On 26 March 2021, Tagoe signed for Tajikistan Higher League club Dushanbe-83.

International career
Tagoe made his debut for the Kyrgyzstan national team on 12 May 2014 in a friendly against Afghanistan, joining fellow Africans David Tetteh, Elijah Ari and Claude Maka Kum as African-born players representing Kyrgyzstan on the international stage.

Personal life
Tagoe is the son of the Crown Prince of a Ghanaian tribe. In October 2015, he married his Kyrgyz girlfriend Elnura Orozbaeva, with their first child born in August 2016.

Career statistics

International

Statistics accurate as of match played 11 January 2019

Honours

Club
Dordoi Bishkek
Kyrgyzstan League (6); 2007, 2008, 2009, 2011, 2012, 2014
Kyrgyzstan Cup (4): 2008, 2010, 2012, 2014
Kyrgyzstan Super Cup (4): 2011, 2012, 2013, 2014
AFC President's Cup (1): 2007
Chittagong Abahani
Sheikh Kamal International Club Cup (1): runner-up 2019

See also
Kyrgyzstan international footballers

References

External links

1986 births
Living people
Ghanaian emigrants to Kyrgyzstan
Ghanaian footballers
Kyrgyzstani footballers
Kyrgyzstan international footballers
Kyrgyzstani expatriate footballers
Berekum Arsenal players
FC Dordoi Bishkek players
Association football midfielders
Expatriate footballers in Kyrgyzstan
Expatriate footballers in Bahrain
Al Hala SC players
Abahani Limited (Chittagong) players
Shan United F.C. players
FC Alay players
2019 AFC Asian Cup players
Kyrgyz Premier League players
Bahraini Premier League players
Bangladesh Premier League players
Tajikistan Higher League players